The Yamaha XV750 or Virago 750 was a Yamaha V-twin cruiser motorcycle. Made from 1981 to 1983 and 1988 to 1998, it was part of Yamaha's Virago line of cruisers. It was Yamaha's first foray into the V-twin cruiser market and shares a frame and many components with the larger XV1100 Virago.

See also 
 Yamaha XV700

Notes

Virago 750
Cruiser motorcycles
Motorcycles introduced in 1981